2-Iodomelatonin is a melatonin analog used as a radiolabelled ligand for the melatonin receptors, MT1, MT2, and MT3. It acts as a full agonist at both MT1 and MT2 receptors.

References

Tryptamines
Melatonin receptor agonists
Acetamides
Iodoarenes
Methoxy compounds